The Yongji Bridge of Chengyang, also called the Chengyang Wind and Rain Bridge, is a bridge in Sanjiang County, of Guangxi, China.

Chengyang Bridge is a special covered bridge or lángqiáo, and one of several Fengyu bridges in the local Dong Minority region. It was completed in 1912. It is also called the Panlong Bridge.

Properties

The bridge is a combination of bridge, corridor, veranda and Chinese pavilion. It has two platforms (one at each end of the bridge), 3 piers, 3 spans, 5 pavilions, 19 verandas, and three floors. The piers are made of stone, the upper structures are mainly wooden, and the roof is covered with tiles. The bridge has wooden handrails on both sides.

The bridge is located in Chengyang, and serves as the link between two populous villages.

Guo Moruo, a famous Chinese author, loved the bridge at first sight and wrote a poem for it.

See also
 Xijin Bridge, another large covered bridge in Zhejiang, China.
 List of bridges in China

References

Bridges in Guangxi
Covered bridges in China
Chinese architectural history
Major National Historical and Cultural Sites in Guangxi
1912 establishments in China
Kam people
Buildings and structures in Liuzhou